Tetiana Mykolaivna Ostashchenko ; born August 1974) is a Ukrainian military doctor, major general and Commander of the Medical Forces of the Ukrainian Armed Forces since 2021. She is the first woman in Ukraine's history to command a military branch, first woman to hold the rank of major general as well as brigadier general.

Biography 
Tetiana Ostashchenko was born in Lviv (Western Ukraine) in August 1974, her father served in the military.

In 1996, she graduated with honors from the Danylo Halytsky Lviv National Medical University (Faculty of Pharmacy). In 1998, Ostashchenko graduated from the Ukrainian Military Medical Academy.

In 2020, she completed courses in defense and security sector reform and strategic leadership for management at Cranfield University (United Kingdom).

Since 1998, she has served in the military, holding the positions of:
 Head of a military unit pharmacy;
 Officer of the Military Medical Department of the Western Operational Command;
 Chief of the Medical Procurement Department of the Central Military Medical Command of the Ukrainian Armed Forces;
 Unit Head at the Military Medical Department of the Ministry of Defence of Ukraine and the General Directorate for Military Cooperation and Peacekeeping Operations of the General Staff of the Ukrainian Armed Forces;
 Chief of the Medical Procurement Department of the Main Military Medical Department;
 Chief Inspector of the Main Inspectorate of the Ministry of Defense of Ukraine.

In July 2021, she was appointed Commander of the Medical Forces of the Ukrainian Armed Forces. Tetiana Ostashchenko became the first woman in Ukraine's history to command a military branch, as well as the first woman to hold the rank of brigadier general.

On 17 June 2022, during the Russian invasion of Ukraine, she was promoted to major general.

References 

Major generals of Ukraine
Ukrainian medical doctors
Ukrainian pharmacists
Danylo Halytsky Lviv National Medical University alumni
1974 births
Living people
Ukrainian women physicians